Walter Edward Mills (7 November 1850 – 17 April 1910) was an English architect.

Mills was articled to the architect Henry Edward Cooper of Bloomsbury in 1868. He established his own independent practice in Banbury, Oxfordshire in about 1875, where by 1881 he had premises at 13, High Street.

Mills served as architectural clerk to the agent for the Clifden Estates, for whom he completed Holdenby House in 1878. Mills designed a number of public buildings in mixed styles, usually neo-Jacobean. His extension of the Oxford Union was completed posthumously.

Mills was elected an Associate of the Royal Institute of British Architects (ARIBA) in 1882.

Works
Holdenby House, Holdenby, Northamptonshire: extension, 1877-78
St. Leonard's parish church, Grimsbury, Oxfordshire, 1890
St. Mary's parish church, Holwell, Oxfordshire: rebuilding, 1895
St. James' parish church, Sarsden, Oxfordshire: north transept and bellcote, 1896
Warwick Road Hospital, Banbury, Oxfordshire: hospital wing, late 19th century
St Hilda's College, Oxford: extension, 1909
Oxford Union, Oxford: second library, 1910-11 (with Thorpe)

References

Sources

1910 deaths
19th-century English architects
Gothic Revival architects
English ecclesiastical architects
1850 births
Architects from Oxfordshire
Associates of the Royal Institute of British Architects